Navadra is a volcanic island located in the Mamanuca Group of Fiji. It is uninhabited, but has an anchorage where local fishermen and visiting yachts anchor.

Access
Navadra is accessible by boat.

See also

 Desert island
 List of islands

References

Uninhabited islands of Fiji
Ba Province
Mamanuca Islands